Los Texmaniacs is a conjunto band created by Max Baca in 1997. In 2010 Los Texmaniacs won a Grammy Award for Tejano Album of The Year "Borders y Bailes". Members include Max Baca on bajo sexto, Josh Baca on accordion, Noel Hernandez on electric bass, and Lorenzo Martinez on the drums. Los Texmaniacs have collaborated with various artists from different genres including Rick Trevino, Flaco Jimenez, Los Lobos and King Montana.
King Montana aka Tecoloso is Max Baca‘s first cousin on his mother side of the family. King Montana is a Grammy nominated disabled Latin rap artist/songwriter  from Albuquerque, New Mexico. He has contributed songwriting to Max Baca’s Grammy award winning group Los Texmaniacs. Max Baca is credited with discovering his cousin King Montana. Max Baca produced King Montana’s very first rap song titled “Brown Superman”.

Early beginnings and influences 
Max Baca was born and raised in Albuquerque, New Mexico. His grandfather was an amateur accordion player, and his father, Max Baca Sr., played accordion in his own band. At age five, Max started learning accordion.

When he was twelve, Baca and his brother Jimmy formed their own group from Albuquerque New Mexico- Los Hermanos Baca- The Band had hit after hit in the Land of Enchantment to include- "Hey Baby Que Paso" an original hit of The Texas Tornados. The Members: Jimmy Baca Accordion & Vocals, Max Baca Bajo Sexto & Vocals, Lee Ray Romero Jr. Bass Guitar and Carl Lee Lucero Drums.

Awards 
In 2010 Los Texmaniacs won a Grammy Award for Best Tejano Album for Borders y Bailes.

Discography 
Los Texmaniacs discography:
 Tex-Mex Groove
 About Time
 Live In Texas
 Borders Y Bailes (2009) on Smithsonian Folkways Recordings
 Texas Towns & Tex-Mex Sounds
 Americano Groove (2015)
 Cruzando Borders (2018)

References

External links 
 Borders y Bailes on Smithsonian Folkways Recordings
 Official Myspace
http://lostexmaniacs.com/

American musical groups
Grammy Award winners
Hispanic American music
Musical groups from Texas
Rappers from New Mexico